Conjunto Santa Rita is a complex of limestone caves in the municipality of Iraquara, Bahia, Brazil. It contains numerous offerings on the altar and inside. The cave has two large parallel galleries joined by a smaller gallery being both associated with a lower slope. About 600  m  have been mapped. The highlight of the cave is a spectacular calcite run-off resembling curtains of over 12  m  tall, besides beautiful stratigraphic features on the walls. The small and adjacent Gruta Santa Rita II, has also been quickly mapped.

See also
List of caves in Brazil

References

External links
 Base de Dados do Ministerio do Meio Hambiente Governo Federal - ICMBIO Official Website

Caves of Bahia
Wild caves